Jigzhi County or Chik Dril is a county of Qinghai Province, China, bordering Sichuan to the southeast and Gansu to the northeast. It is under the administration of Golog Tibetan Autonomous Prefecture. The seat of Jigzhi County is in the Town of Chugqênsumdo.

Administrative divisions
Jigzhi is divided into one town and five townships:

Chugqênsumdo Town
Baiyu Township
Wa'eryi Township
Wasai Township
Suohurima Township
Mentang Township

Climate

See also
 List of administrative divisions of Qinghai

References

External links

County-level divisions of Qinghai
Golog Tibetan Autonomous Prefecture